Belfast St Anne's was a constituency of the Parliament of Northern Ireland.

Boundaries
Belfast St Anne's was a borough constituency comprising part of south-western Belfast. It was created in 1929 when the House of Commons (Method of Voting and Redistribution of Seats) Act (Northern Ireland) 1929 introduced first past the post elections throughout Northern Ireland.

Belfast St Anne's was created by the division of Belfast West into four new constituencies. It survived unchanged, returning one member of Parliament, until the Parliament of Northern Ireland was temporarily suspended in 1972, and then formally abolished in 1973.

The constituency contained areas between the current Lisburn Road and Falls Road and consisted of the former St George's ward and most of the former St Anne's ward - although unusually it did not include the eponymous cathedral which was in Belfast Central.

The constituency is now part of Belfast South and Belfast West.

Politics
The constituency was solidly unionist and always elected Ulster Unionist Party Members of Parliament, but was usually contested by labour movement candidates who sometimes polled well.

Members of Parliament

Election results

At the 1953 and 1958 general elections, Edmond Warnock was elected unopposed.

References

St Anne
Northern Ireland Parliament constituencies established in 1929
Northern Ireland Parliament constituencies disestablished in 1973